Beer is a village in Ajmer tehsil of Ajmer district of Rajasthan state in India. The village falls under Beer gram panchayat. Now it comes under newly created Panchyat Samiti - 'Ajmer Rural' Panchyat Samiti, approx 20 km away from Ajmer. This newly panchyat samiti was created in November, 2019.  

Earlier it was famous as a picnic spot due to his magnificent water pond (तालाब). This pond was built in the year 1872-1874. It is also known as Foolsagar.

Demography
As per 2011 census of India, Beer has population of 4,709 of which 2,389 are males and 2,320 are females. Sex ratio of the village is 971.

Transportation
Beer is connected by air (Kishangarh Airport), by train (Adarshnagar railway station) and by road.

See also
Ajmer Tehsil
Adarshnagar railway station

References

Villages in Ajmer district